The Mikkelsen Islands are a small group of islands and rocks lying off the southeast coast of Adelaide Island,  southeast of the Léonie Islands. They were discovered by the French Antarctic Expedition under Jean-Baptiste Charcot in 1908–10 and named by him for Otto Mikkelsen, the Norwegian diver who inspected the damaged hull of the Pourquoi-Pas at Deception Island.

See also 
 List of Antarctic and subantarctic islands

References

External links

Archipelagoes of the Southern Ocean
Islands of Adelaide Island